Tommies is a British radio drama series, broadcast on BBC Radio 4. It is part of the BBC's World War I centenary season and planned to be broadcast over four years, the same length of time as the war itself. Based on actual unit war diaries, it tells the story of a one day in the conflict exactly 100 years ago to the day.

Most of the episodes are set in either Flanders (the trench lines of the Western Front) or the Balkans (Salonika front), while a few narrate events in Africa or the Near East.  The two principal characters are Mickey Bliss, a professional signals (wireless and telephone) NCO of the Indian army, whose initiative leads to his becoming an intelligence officer, and Celestine de Tullio, an English doctor who volunteers as a medical officer with the Serbian army in the Balkans, partly to avoid both her estranged family and Mickey Bliss. 

Producers of the radio plays are David Hunter, Jonquil Panting and Jonathan Ruffle.  Authors of the play scripts include Jonathan Ruffle, Michael Chaplin, Avin Shah, Nick Warburton and Nandita Ghose.

Cast and characters

 Lee Ross - Sergeant Mickey Bliss, of the Signals Section, Lahore Division, British Indian Army
 Danny Rahim - Ahmadullah Khan, a Havildar in the Signals Section, Lahore Division, British Indian Army.
 Rudi Dharmalingam - Pavan Jodha, a Jemadar in the Signals Section, Lahore Division, British Indian Army.
 Pippa Nixon - Celestine de Tullio, a doctor.
 Patrick Kennedy - Robert de Tullio, banker and husband of Celestine.
 Alex Wyndham - Lieutenant Maberley Dunster, of B Squadron, 15th King's Hussars, British Army.
 Tony Pitts - Sergeant Walter Oddy, of the Signals Section, 2nd Division, British Expeditionary Force.
 Elaine Claxton - Sister Marjorie Blaikeley, based in a Boulogne military hospital.
 Clive Hayward - Major Hector Monkhouse, of the 15th Bengal Lancers, British Indian Army.
 Sam Valentine - Harry de Tullio, young Pilot with the British army.

Cultural References

"Mickey Bliss" is Cockney rhyming slang.

References

External links
 
 
 

BBC Radio 4 programmes
BBC Radio dramas
2014 radio programme debuts
Period radio series
World War I in popular culture